Rigolboche is a 1936 French historical musical film directed by Christian-Jaque and starring Mistinguett, André Lefaur and Jules Berry. It portrays a fictionalized version of the life of Rigolboche, the dancer who made the Can-can famous.

The film's sets were designed by the art director  and Georges Wakhévitch.

Cast
Joe Alex as a dark man
André Berley as Tabourot
Jules Berry as Bobby
Mady Berry as Madame Corbin
 as director of Criminal investigation department
Lino Carenzio as Fredo
Amy Collin as typer

Pedro Elviro
André Lefaur as Xavier-Martin, Count of Saint-Servan
Charles Lemontier as Saturnin - director
Mistinguett as Lina Bourget
 as dancer
Le Petit Patachou as Cricri
Georges Paulais as investigating judge
Robert Pizani as Lecor - the dealer
 as the dresser
 as Lucien Mirvaux
Yves Deniaud as Gloria's cashier
Erika
Georges-François Frontec

References

External links

French historical musical films
1930s historical musical films
Films directed by Christian-Jaque
Films set in Paris
Films set in the 19th century
French black-and-white films
Films scored by Casimir Oberfeld
1930s French films